Mahanama College is a Sinhala Buddhist boys school in Colombo, Sri Lanka which was established in 1954. As a public, national school, it is controlled by the central government, as opposed to a provincial council. It provides both primary and secondary education.

College

Location
Mahanama College is located in Kollupitiya. College's main entrance is located at R. A. D. Mel Mawatha, Colombo 3 while the south premise is situated right next to C.M.S. Ladies' College.

History

The institution was founded in 1954 by W. A. K. Gunawardana in Sri Wardanarama, Colombo, with just five students in the class. In 1958, the school was registered as a government-assisted junior school. The number of students gradually increased to 163 with four staff members and, on 1 January 1960, J. D. A. Jayakodi was appointed as the first principal of the school. By 1969, there were 14 staff members and 373 students

With the rapid increase in student enrollment, the school moved to a nearby location, Valukarama. Primary classes were held in a nearby building, Thurstan College. In 1974, during T. N. Silva's time as principal, the junior school at Thurstan College moved to its present location, Mahanama College. In 1975, 130 students sat for the national General Certificate of Education, and 107 students passed the exam. The government donated  of land as the school expanded. By 1976, the site contained several two-story buildings.

During the early 1970s, principal N. E. Fernando made improvements to the school's facilities, including the construction of a dental unit and additional classrooms, as well as the first two-story building. Principal K. N. P. de Silva retired on 5 February 1986 and was succeeded by D.G. Sumanasekera. Sumanasekera was the first SLEAS Class-1 principal to head Mahanama. During his four years in office, he laid the foundation for the present school.

K. K. Rathnadasa became principal in 1990 and, during his time at the college, several three-storey buildings were constructed, a computer section was established, and a children's park was created. The annual carnival 'Foot-Loose' was also organised during his tenure.

In 1999, G. Liyanage became principal. He added a three-storey building with an art gallery to the existing campus. During his tenure, the school laboratories and computer sections were improved and buildings renovated. The Battle of the Golds also known as "Big Match" between Mahanama College and its friendly rival D. S. Senanayake College, Colombo, was inaugurated.

Administration and Education

As it is a national school, college is funded by the Ministry of Education. Ministry appoints principal, the head of the administration. The principal is assisted by Vice principals and academic staff. Like other Sri Lankan colleges, the school is divided into three sections named primary, middle and upper school. Each section under its own sectional head who controls the specific sector of the school. School also appointed prefects to maintain the discipline. Prefects are pupils who have been given limited authority over other pupils in the school, similar to the authority given to a hall monitor or safety patrol member.

Mahanama college only consists of Buddhist and Sinhala students. Sinhala is the official language used in the school. However, students can choose Sinhala or English medium to do their higher educations.

Principals

Ven. Vahalle Dhammananda Thero (1954–1960)
J. D. A. Jayakody (1960–1968)
N. E. Fernando (1968–1974)
T. S. Silva (1974–1976)
K. N. P. de Silva (1976–1986)
D. G. Sumanasekara (1986–1990)
K. K. Ratnadasa (1990–1999)
G. Liyanage (1999–2003)
W. H. Premalal Kumarasiri (2003–2012)
U. M. Prasanna Upashantha (2013–2016)
L. M. D. Dharmasena (2016–2020)
R. A. R. M. Rathnayake (2020–2021)
A. M. A. A. C. Perera  (2021–present)

School houses 
Students are divided into four houses, whose names are derived from Sanskrit language.

Sports and extracurricular activities 
Eighteen sports are played in Mahanama College.

Cricket
The Battle of the Golds is the annual cricket contest between D. S. Senanayake College and Mahanama College. It began in 2007, and is commonly referred to as the "Big Match." The contest revives their age-old cricketing tradition. The "Golden parade" of Mahanama College is a parade of vehicles that runs through the streets of Colombo. It is organized by the Old Boys Association of Mahanama College. Every year large crowds from both schools gather at the SSC Cricket Ground to witness the encounter. Below are listed the results to date:

Co-curricular Activities

Societies

Mahanama College Media Unit (MCMU) 
Mahanama College Media Unit is one of the leading and pioneering school media units in Sri Lanka. The Media Unit of Mahanama College was started in 1987 and, this is one of Sri Lanka’s oldest school media unit which has more than 33 years of history and experience. The Media Unit has achieved:

 First school radio to transmit through short wave amateur radio technology.
 First school television to transmit a live big match one day encounter on Facebook Live
 Sri Lanka’s first school media website to awarded in Sri Lanka’s only web designing competition BestWeb.lk in the year 2020.

Notable Events

In 2014, Mahanama College's 60th anniversary and annual prize-giving was held under the patronage of President Mahinda Rajapaksa and Bandula Gunawardena. The president awarded students and teachers who had excelled in various fields.

References

External links
 Mahanama College Official Website
 Official website - Mahanama College OBA Australia Inc.
 Mahanama College Media Unit
 FM Mahanama

Educational institutions established in 1954
National schools in Sri Lanka
Schools in Colombo
1954 establishments in Ceylon
Buddhist schools in Sri Lanka
Schools in Colombo District
Boys' schools in Sri Lanka